Anja Brandt (born 15 February 1990) is a retired German female volleyball player. She was part of the Germany women's national volleyball team.

She participated in the 2010 FIVB Volleyball Women's World Championship. She played with Schweriner SC.

Clubs
  VG Elmshorn (2005–2006)
  VC Olympia Berlin (2006–2009)
  Schweriner SC (2009–Present)

References

External links 
 
 

1990 births
Living people
German women's volleyball players
European Games competitors for Germany
Volleyball players at the 2015 European Games
Sportspeople from Hamburg